Jackson Jesús Rodríguez Ortíz (born February 25, 1985 in Rubio) is a Venezuelan professional road bicycle racer, who currently rides for amateur team JHS Grupo–Super Ahorro.

Major results

2005
 4th Overall Vuelta a Venezuela
 8th Overall Vuelta a Cuba
1st Young rider classification
 10th Overall Vuelta al Táchira
1st Stage 5
2006
 1st Stage 7 Clásico Ciclístico Banfoandes
 4th Road race, Central American and Caribbean Games
 5th Overall Vuelta a Cuba
1st Young rider classification
1st Stage 2
 7th Overall Vuelta al Táchira
1st Young rider classification
1st Stage 11
 9th Overall Vuelta a Venezuela
1st Mountains classification
1st Stage 5
2007
 3rd Overall Vuelta al Táchira
1st  Points classification
1st  Young rider classification
1st Stage 2 (TTT)
 8th Road race, Pan American Road Championships
2008
 1st Stage 5a Vuelta a la Independencia Nacional
 1st Stage 3 Vuelta a Bramón
 3rd Overall Volta ao Alentejo
1st Stage 1
 4th Tour du Finistère
 7th Overall Tour de Langkawi
 8th Overall Vuelta a Venezuela
1st Stage 2
 10th Overall Tour of Qinghai Lake
 10th Overall Clásico Ciclístico Banfoandes
2009
 1st Overall Vuelta Mexico Telmex
1st Stage 2
 3rd Overall Tour de Langkawi
 3rd GP Industria & Artigianato di Larciano
 10th Overall Tour de San Luis
 10th Overall Giro del Trentino
2010
 5th GP Industria & Artigianato di Larciano
 6th Overall Tour de San Luis
1st Stage 5
 6th Giro dell'Appennino
 8th Overall Settimana Internazionale di Coppi e Bartali
2011
 1st Stage 1b (TTT) Settimana Internazionale di Coppi e Bartali
 4th Giro dell'Appennino
 10th GP Industria & Artigianato di Larciano
2012
 1st Stage 5 Vuelta a Venezuela
 5th Overall Tour de Langkawi
2013
 6th Overall Vuelta a Venezuela
1st Stages 6 & 9
 9th GP Industria & Artigianato di Larciano
2014
 8th Road race, Central American and Caribbean Games
2016
 1st Stage 10 Vuelta al Táchira
2017
 9th Overall Vuelta al Táchira
1st Stage 2
2019
 1st Stage 3 Vuelta Ciclista a Miranda

Grand Tour general classification results timeline

References

External links 

1985 births
Living people
Venezuelan male cyclists
Cyclists at the 2008 Summer Olympics
Cyclists at the 2012 Summer Olympics
Olympic cyclists of Venezuela
Vuelta a Venezuela stage winners
People from Rubio, Venezuela
South American Games bronze medalists for Venezuela
South American Games medalists in cycling
Competitors at the 2014 South American Games
20th-century Venezuelan people
21st-century Venezuelan people
Competitors at the 2006 Central American and Caribbean Games